Bishop of Bathurst may refer to:

Anglican
 Anglican Bishop of Bathurst, of the Anglican Diocese of Bathurst in the Anglican Church of Australia

Roman Catholic
 Roman Catholic Bishop of Bathurst (Australia), of the Roman Catholic Diocese of Bathurst in New South Wales, Australia
 Roman Catholic Bishop of Bathurst (Canada), of the Roman Catholic Diocese of Bathurst in New Brunswick, Canada